Sara Penzo (born 16 December 1989) is an Italian former football goalkeeper who played for women's Serie A club UPC Tavagnacco and the Italy women's national football team. In 2012, she signed for Serie A club ACF Brescia, following a season in the Swiss Nationalliga A playing for the women's section of FC Basel. She was part of the Italian squad at the 2009 and 2013 editions of the UEFA Women's Championship.

International career
After helping Italy win the 2008 UEFA Women's Under-19 Championship, conceding one goal in four games, she was named in the squad for UEFA Women's Euro 2009 as an understudy to Anna Maria Picarelli.

Penzo made her senior debut for Italy in March 2010, in a 3–2 defeat by England at the 2010 Cyprus Cup.

National coach Antonio Cabrini named Penzo in his selection for UEFA Women's Euro 2013 in Sweden.

References

External links
Sara Penzo UEFA profile
Sara Penzo FC Basel profile
Sara Penzo at Football.it 

1989 births
Living people
Expatriate women's footballers in Switzerland
Italian women's footballers
Italy women's international footballers
People from Chioggia
Serie A (women's football) players
Torres Calcio Femminile players
Italian expatriate sportspeople in Switzerland
Italian expatriate women's footballers
Women's association football goalkeepers
U.P.C. Tavagnacco players
Roma Calcio Femminile players
S.S. Lazio Women 2015 players
Sportspeople from the Metropolitan City of Venice
Footballers from Veneto
FC Basel Frauen players